The Forest Hill Historic District is a national historic district located at Richmond, Virginia.  The district encompasses 1,106 contributing buildings and 5 contributing structures located south of downtown Richmond. The primarily residential area developed starting in the early-20th century as one of the city's early "streetcar suburbs." The buildings are in a variety of popular late-19th and early-20th century architectural styles including frame bungalows, Colonial Revival, Tudor Revival, and Mission Revival. The buildings in Forest Hill
exemplify a high quality of materials in their construction. Brick is the dominant building material. Notable non-residential buildings include Forest Hill Presbyterian Church; Good Shepherd Episcopal Church; and Forest Hill Church of Christ.

It was added to the National Register of Historic Places in 2012.

References

Streetcar suburbs
Historic districts on the National Register of Historic Places in Virginia
Colonial Revival architecture in Virginia
Tudor Revival architecture in Virginia
Mission Revival architecture in Virginia
Buildings and structures in Richmond, Virginia
National Register of Historic Places in Richmond, Virginia